The Capt. Seth Baker Jr. House is a historic house in Barnstable, Massachusetts, USA. Built about 1850, it is a late example of transitional Federal-Greek Revival architecture, and a somewhat modest house built for a ship's captain. It was listed on the National Register of Historic Places in 1987.

Description and history
The Captain Seth Baker Jr. House stands in a busy commercial area of the village of Hyannis, on the south side of Main Street between Parkway Place and Bayview Street. It is a -story wood-frame structure, with a side-gable roof, central chimney, and clapboarded exterior. Its front facade is five bays wide, with a central entrance framed by Federal style slender pilasters, tall frieze, and projecting cornice. Greek Revival features include its slightly lower window placement and the clapboarded exterior. A modern single-story addition extends to the rear.

The house was built about 1850, and its survival in what is now a commercial area is a reminder of the area's early history. It was built by Seth Baker, Jr., a deep-sea ship's captain. The house's modest features are a contrast to the more elaborate houses often built by ship's captains in the area, indicating that there was a wide range of economic situations in that profession. The house now houses professional offices.

See also
National Register of Historic Places listings in Barnstable, Massachusetts

References

National Register of Historic Places in Barnstable, Massachusetts
Houses in Barnstable, Massachusetts
Houses on the National Register of Historic Places in Barnstable County, Massachusetts
Greek Revival architecture in Massachusetts
Federal architecture in Massachusetts